Benner is a surname. Notable people with the surname include:

Carl Benner, American engineer
Emmanuel Benner (1836–1896), French artist
Erica Benner, British political philosopher
George Benner (1859–1930), American congressman
Hugh Benner (1899–1975), American religious figure
Jean Benner (1836–1906), French artist
Joseph Sieber Benner (1872-1938), American spiritual writer
Katie Benner, American reporter
Maikel Benner (born 1980), Dutch baseball player
Michael Paul Benner (1935–1957), British recipient of the George Cross
Stanley G. Benner (1916–1942), United States Marine Corps officer and Silver Star recipient
Steven A. Benner, American scientist